Surf City Squeeze is a chain of smoothie and restaurants, which is franchised by Kahala Brands of Scottsdale, Arizona.  The chain was founded in Phoenix, Arizona in 1981 by Kevin Blackwell. As of 2010 Surf City Squeeze has more than 100 franchise locations operating in Canada, Saudi Arabia, Curaçao/Netherlands Antilles and United States.

References

External links
 

Restaurants established in 1981
Multinational companies
Fast-food chains of the United States
Companies based in Scottsdale, Arizona
Regional restaurant chains in the United States
Kahala Brands
1981 establishments in Arizona